Abudefduf bengalensis, known as the Bengal sergeant or the narrow-banded sergeant major, is a species of damselfish in the family Pomacentridae. It is a marine species native to the tropical Indo-Pacific, where it ranges from the eastern Indian Ocean to Australia and Japan in the Pacific Ocean, and it is not known to occur in the Red Sea. Adults of the species are typically found in coral reef and lagoon environments at a depth of 1 to 6 m (3 to 20 ft), where they typically occur singly or in small groups.

Bengal sergeants feed primarily on algae, gastropods, and crabs. The species is known to be highly territorial, and distinct pairs between individuals are formed during breeding. It is known to be oviparous, with males guarding and aerating eggs. The species reaches 17 cm (6.7 inches) in total length.

References 

bengalensis
Fish of the Indian Ocean
Fish of the Pacific Ocean
Fish described in 1787